The loch runs south west to north east and is an impounding reservoir located to the west of Lochgilphead, Scotland. It is one of a number of lochs supplying water to the Crinan Canal. The earthen dam is 15 metres high. Records show the dam was constructed before 1860.

See also
 List of reservoirs and dams in the United Kingdom

Sources
"Argyll and Bute Council Reservoirs Act 1975 Public Register"
Scotlands Places - Crinan Canal, Glen Clachaig Feeder Reservoir System

Reservoirs in Argyll and Bute